US Post Office-Malone is a historic post office building located at Malone in Franklin County, New York, United States. It was designed and built in 1934, and is one of a number of post offices in New York State designed by the Office of the Supervising Architect of the Treasury Department under Louis A. Simon.  The building is in the Classical Revival style and is three stories in height with a five-bay, two-story entrance pavilion, one-story side wings and a two-story rear wing. It is of steel frame construction and clad in yellow brick trimmed with limestone.

It was listed on the National Register of Historic Places in 1989.

References

Malone
Government buildings completed in 1934
Neoclassical architecture in New York (state)
Buildings and structures in Franklin County, New York
National Register of Historic Places in Franklin County, New York
1934 establishments in New York (state)